The 1985 UNLV Rebels football team was an American football team that represented the University of Nevada, Las Vegas in the Pacific Coast Athletic Association during the 1985 NCAA Division I-A football season. In their fourth year under head coach Harvey Hyde, the team compiled a 5–5–1 record.

Schedule

References

UNLV
UNLV Rebels football seasons
UNLV Rebels football